Hexaborane, also called hexaborane(10) to distinguish it from hexaborane(12) (B6H12), is an inorganic compound with the formula B6H10.  It is a colorless liquid that is unstable in air.

Structure 

Hexaborane(10) is classified as a nido-cluster. The boron atoms define a pentagonal pyramid, with four bridging hydrogen atoms and six terminal ones. The point group of the molecule is Cs.

Preparation and reactions 
A laboratory route begins with bromination of pentaborane(11) followed by deprotonation of the bromide to give [BrB5H7]−.  This anionic cluster is reduced with diborane to give the neutral product:
K[BrB5H7]  +  1/2 B2H6   →   KBr  +  B6H10
It can also be generated by pyrolysis of pentaborane(11).

B6H10 can be deprotonated to give [B6H9]− or protonated to give [B6H11]+. It can act as a Lewis base towards reactive borane radicals, forming various conjuncto-clusters.

References

Boranes